Piz Scalottas is a mountain of the Plessur Alps, located near Lenzerheide in the canton of Graubünden, Switzerland.

In winter a chairlift brings skiers to the summit of Piz Scalottas. The mountain offers a good view to overlook both sides, Lenzerheide to the east and the Domleschg valley to the west. If you liked to discover the area during summer by mountain bike, the chairlift to Piz Scalottas will transport your mountain bike for free to the summit.

See also
List of mountains of Switzerland accessible by public transport

References

External links
 Piz Scalottas on Hikr

Mountains of Graubünden
Mountains of the Alps
Mountains of Switzerland
Two-thousanders of Switzerland
Vaz/Obervaz